Stolniceni-Prăjescu is a commune in Iași County, Western Moldavia, Romania. It is composed of three villages: Brătești, Cozmești and Stolniceni-Prăjescu.

Natives
Matei Millo

References

Communes in Iași County
Localities in Western Moldavia